NoBusiness Records is an independent record label, based in Vilnius, Lithuania.

History
The label was founded in 2008 by Danas Mikailionis and Valerij Anosov. The latter is the owner of a jazz-oriented record store in Vilnius named Thelonious; according to Mikailionis, it is "probably the only store in Vilnius where one can find non-commercial music." Prior to starting the label, Mikailionis and Anosov put on concerts that featured artists such as William Parker, Matthew Shipp, Howard Riley, Joe McPhee, and Barry Guy. However, it was saxophonist Mats Gustafsson who, after performing a solo set, as well as one with Lithuanian musicians, encouraged them to found their own record label. Gustafsson's performances were issued as The Vilnius Implosion (solo), the label's first CD release, and The Vilnius Explosion (ensemble), their first vinyl release.

In 2010, NoBusiness began working with musicologist Ed Hazell on historical multiple-CD collections, such as The Complete Recordings 1981–1983 by the band Commitment, featuring William Parker, Will Connell, Jr., Jason Kao Hwang, and Zen Matsuura, Jemeel Moondoc's Muntu Recordings, and William Parker's Centering: Unreleased Early Recordings 1976–1987. In 2017, the label initiated a collaboration with the Japanese Chap Chap label, starting with the release of The Conscience, by trombonist Paul Rutherford and drummer Sabu Toyozumi. In 2019, NoBusiness issued the first CD in a six-volume Sam Rivers archival series, while 2020 saw the beginning of the Contemporary Classics Series with releases featuring music by Lithuanian composers Osvaldas Balakauskas and Onutė Narbutaitė. In a 2023 interview, Mikailionis stated that the label will also continue to document early European free jazz, with releases by groups such as Total Music Association, Modern Jazz Quintet Karlsruhe, and Free Jazz Group Wiesbaden.

Practices
Writer Peter Margasak praised NoBusiness's "DIY spirit and passion," and noted that their focus on free jazz can be seen as a response to the fact that, after the Soviet era in Lithuania, "jazz lost its subversive status," and "commercial treacle came flooding in." The label has consistently focused on quality and attention to detail; Mikailionis stated: "We don't want to release music only for the sake of releasing it. That's why we put great attention to the selection of the projects planned for the future."

Since its inception, NoBusiness has issued both CDs and vinyl records. According to Mikailionis, "Visual aesthetic enjoyment combined with the process of listening to vinyl makes it a much greater pleasure for us than listening to a CD." Most releases can also be downloaded in digital format.

Reception
Clifford Allen of All About Jazz called NoBusiness Records "a startlingly active imprint with an extraordinary deep catalogue," and wrote that the label "has clearly emerged as the current cultural ambassador for Lithuania." Writers for The Free Jazz Collective praised the fact that, "over the years, NoBusiness has been dedicated to unearthing and releasing long-unheard music from a number of musicians," and noted that the Sam Rivers Archive Series "looks to be a beautiful physical manifestation of the love and respect that NoBusiness Record's Danas Mikailionis has for NYC loft era free jazz." Author Daniel Fischlin stated that the label is "devoted to an impressive catalogue of performers working across free jazz and improvised music and expanding the space for non-commercial creative voicings that disrupt mainstream music."

NoBusiness releases have received praise and end-of-year awards from The New York Times, the BBC, DownBeat, The Wire, The New York City Jazz Record, Tom Hull, NPR, JazzTimes, Point of Departure, Dusted, Cadence, and Jazz Word. In 2012, Ed Hazell was an ASCAP Deems Taylor Award recipient for his liner notes for Billy Bang's Survival Ensemble - Black Man's Blues.

CD releases

 NBCD 1	Mats Gustafsson - Vilnius Explosion
 NBCD 2	Dominic Duval / Jimmy Halperin - Monk Dreams
 NBCD 3	Adam Caine Trio - Thousandfold
 NBCD 4	Marc Ducret / Liudas Mockunas - Silent Vociferation
 NBCD 5	Marilyn Lerner / Ken Filiano / Lou Grassi - Arms Spread Wide
 NBCD 6	Dennis González - Songs of Early Autumn
 NBCD7–9	Jemeel Moondoc / Arthur Williams / Mark Hennen / William Parker / Rashid Bakr (musician) - Muntu Recordings
 NBCD 10	Vladimir Tarasov - Thinking of Khlebnikov
 NBCD 11	Curtis Clark Trio - Taagi  
 NBCD 12–13	Howard Riley - Solo in Vilnius
 NBCD 14–15	Jason Kao Hwang / Will Conner Jr. / William Parker / Takeshi Zen Matsuura - Commitment: The Complete Recordings 1981–1983
 NBCD 16	The Nu Band (Roy Campbell Jr. / Mark Whitecage / Joe Fonda / Lou Grassi) - Live in Paris
 NBCD 17	Dominic Duval / Jimmy Halperin / Brian Willson - Music of John Coltrane 
 NBCD 18	Joëlle Léandre / India Cooke - Journey
 NBCD 19	Liudas Mockūnas / Ryoji Hojito - Vacation Music
 NBCD 20	Oluyemi Thomas / Sirone / Michael Wimberly - Beneath Tones Floor
 NBCD 21–26	Howard Riley - The Complete Short Stories 1998–2010
 NBCD 27	Terrence McManus / Mark Helias / Gerry Hemingway - Transcendental Numbers
 NBCD 28	William Hooker / Thomas Chapin - Crossing Points 
 NBCD 29	Sei Miguel / Pedro Gomes - Turbina Anthem
 NBCD 30–31	Billy Bang's Survival Ensemble - Black Man's Blues / New York Collage 
 NBCD 32	Joe McPhee / Michael Zerang - Creole Gardens
 NBCD 33	Karl Berger / Werner Hasler / Gilbert Paeffgen - Eponimous
 NBCD 34	Pascal Niggenkemper / Simon Nabatov / Gerald Cleaver - Upcoming Hurricane
 NBCD 35–36	Julius Hemphill / Peter Kowald - Live at Kassiopeia
 NBCD 37	Liudas Mockunas / NuClear - Drop It
 NBCD 38	Daunik Lazro - Curare
 NBCD 39	Narada Burton Greene - Live at Kerrytown House
 NBCD 40	Andrew Lamb - Rhapsody in Black
 NBCD 41	Henry P. Warner / Earl Freeman / Philip Spigner - Freestyle Band
 NBCD 42–47	William Parker - Centering: Unreleased Early Recordings 1976–1987
 NBCD 48	Carlos Zingaro - Live at Total Meeting
 NBCD 49	Lisa Mezzacappa / Vinny Golia / Marco Eneidi / Vijay Anderson - Hell-Bent in the Pacific
 NBCD 50	The Group (Ahmed Abdullah / Marion Brown / Billy Bang / Fred Hopkins / Sirone / Andrew Cyrille) - Live
 NBCD 51	SUDO Quartet (Joëlle Léandre / Sebi Tramontana / Carlos Zingaro / Paul Lovens) - Live at Banlieue Bleue 
 NBCD 52	William Hooker Quintet featuring Adam Lane - Channels of Consciousness
 NBCD 53	Convergence Quartet (Alexander Hawkins / Taylor Ho Bynum / Dominic Lash / Harris Eisenstadt) - Slow and Steady
 NBCD 54	Quat Quartet (Els Vandeweyer / Fred Van Hove / Paul Lovens / Martin Blume) - Live at Hasselt
 NBCD 55	Evan Parker / Barry Guy / Paul Lytton - Live at Maya Recordings Festival
 NBCD 56	Melodic Art-Tet (Ahmed Abdullah / Charles Brackeen / William Parker / Roger Blank / Tony Waters) - Melodic Art-Tet
 NBCD 57	Steven Lugerner / Darren Johnston / Myra Melford / Matt Wilson - For We Have Heard
 NBCD 58	Howard Riley - Live with Repertoire
 NBCD 59–60	Elton Dean / Paul Dunmall / Paul Rogers / Tony Bianco - Remembrance
 NBCD 61	Adam Lane / Darius Jones / Vijay Anderson - Absolute Horizon 
 NBCD 62	Daunik Lazro / Joëlle Léandre - Hasparren
 NBCD 63	2° étage( Jean Luc Cappozzo / Gerry Hemingway / Christine Wodrascka) - Grey Matter
 NBCD 64–65	Kidd Jordan / Peter Kowald / Alvin Fielder - Trio and Duo in New Orleans
 NBCD 66	Max Johnson / Ingrid Laubrock / Mat Maneri / Tomas Fujiwara - The Prisoner
 NBCD 67	Rodrigo Amado / Peter Evans / Miguel Mira / Gabriel Ferrandini - Freedom Principle
 NBCD 68	William Hooker / Liudas Mockunas - Live at Vilnius Jazz Festival
 NBCD 69	RED trio and Mattias Ståhl - North and the Red Stream
 NBCD 70	Dave Burrell / Steve Swell - Turning Point
 NBCD 71	Billy Bang / William Parker - Medicine Buddha
 NBCD 72–73	Ted Daniel's Energy Module featuring Oliver Lake and Daniel Carter - Innerconnection
 NBCD 74–75	Paul Hubweber / Frank Paul Schubert / Alexander von Schlippenbach - Intricacies
 NBCD 76–77	Karl Berger / Kirk Knuffke - Moon
 NBCD 78	Martin Küchen / Johan Berthling / Steve Noble - Night in Europe
 NBCD 79	Free Jazz Group Wiesbaden - Frictions / Frictions Now
 NBCD 80–81	John Carter - Echoes from Rudolph's
 NBCD 82–85	 William Hooker featuring David S. Ware and David Murray - Light: The Early Years 1975–1989
 NBCD 86	Jason Roebke Octet - Cinema Spiral
 NBCD 87	Aaron Bennett / Darren Johnston / Lisa Mezzacappa / Frank Rosaly - Shipwreck 4
 NBCD 88	Peter Kuhn Trio - The Other Shore
 NBCD 89–90	Peter Kuhn with Toshinori Kondo / William Parker / Denis Charles - No Coming, No Going - 1978–1979
 NBCD 91–95	Howard Riley - Constant Change 1976–2016
 NBCD 96	Albert Cirera / Agusti Fernandez / Hernani Faustino / Gabriel Ferrandini - Before the Silence
 NBCD 97	Francois Carrier / Rafal Mazur / Michel Lambert - The Joy of Being
 NBCD 98	The Attic (Rodrigo Amado / Goncalo Almeida / Marco Franco) - The Attic
 NBCD 99	Paul Rutherford / Sabu Toyozumi - The Conscience
 NBCD 100	Itaru Oki / Nobuyoshi Ino / Choi Sun Bae - Kami Fusen
 NBCD 101	Yedo Gibson / Hermani Faustino / Vasco Trilla - Chain
 NBCD 102	Midori Takada / Kim Dae Hwan / Masahiko Satoh - Prophecy of Nue
 NBCD 103	Barre Phillips / Motoharu Yoshizawa - Oh My, Those Boys!
 NBCD 104	Kang Tae Hwan - Live at Café Amores
 NBCD 105	Bobby Naughton / Wadada Leo Smith / Perry Robinson - The Haunt
 NBCD 106	Alexander von Schlippenbach / Aki Takase - Live at Café Amores
 NBCD 107	Kaoru Abe / Sabu Toyozumi - Mannyoka
 NBCD 108	Choi Sun Bae / Junji Hirose / Motoharu Yoshizawa / Kim Dae Whan - Arrirang Fantasy
 NBCD 109	Marion Brown / Dave Burrell - Live at the Black Musicians Conference, 1981
 NBCD 110	Wadada Leo Smith / Sabu Toyozumi - Burning Meditation 
 NBCD 111	Howard Riley - Live in the USA
 NBCD 112	Simon Nabatov / Barry Guy / Gerry Hemingway - Luminous
 NBCD 113	Liudas Mockunas - Hydro 2
 NBCD 114	Detail (Frode Gjerstad / Johnny Mbizo Dyani / John Stevens) - Day Two
 NBCD 115	Midori Takada / Kang Tae Hwan - An Eternal Moment
 NBCD 116	Sunny Murray / Bob Dickey / Robert Andreano - Homework
 NBCD 117	The Attic (Rodrigo Amado / Goncalo Almeida / Onno Gowaert) - Summer Bummer
 NBCD 118	Sam Rivers - Archive Series Vol. 1: Emanation
 NBCD 119	Katarsis 4 - Katarsis 4
 NBCD 120	Masahiko Satoh / Sabu Toyozumi - The Aiki
 NBCD 121	Steve Swell trio - Brain in a Dish
 NBCD 122	Juan Vinuesa Jazz Quartet featuring Jason Roebke, Josh Berman and Mikel Avery - Blue Shots from Chicago
 NBCD 123 	Evan Parker / Barry Guy / Paul Lytton - Concert in Vilnius
 NBCD 124	Sam Rivers - Archive Series Vol. 2: Zenith
 NBCD 125	Francois Carrier / Masayo Koketsu / Daisuke Fuwa / Takashi Itani - Japan Suite
 NBCD 126	Adam Caine / Adam Lane / Billy Mintz / Bob Lanzetti / Nick Lyons - Transmissions
 NBCD 127	Threadbare (Jason Stein / Ben Cruz / Emerson Hunton) - Silver Dollar
 NBCD 128	Sam Rivers - Archive Series Vol. 3: Ricochet
 NBCD 129–131	Modern Jazz Quintet Karlsruhe / Four Men Only - Complete Recordings
 NBCD 132	Derek Bailey / Mototeru Takagi - Live at FarOut, Atsugi, 1987
 NBCD 133	Frank Gratkowski / Achim Kaufmann / Wilbert de Joode / Tony Buck - Flatbosc & Cautery
 NBCD 134	Sabu Toyozumi / Mats Gustafsson - Hokusai
 NBCD 135	Masayuki JoJo Takayanagi / Nobuyoshi Ino / Masabumi PUU Kikuchi - Live at Jazz inn Lovely 1990
 NBCD 136–137	RED trio + Celebration Band - Suite 10 Years Anniversary
 NBCD 138	Sam Rivers - Archive Series Vol. 4: Braids
 NBCD 139	Katarsis 4 - Live at the Underground Water Reservoir
 NBCD 140	Liudas Mockunas / Akira Sakata / Otomo Yoshihide / Kazutoki Umezu / Masayo Koketsu - In Residency at Bitches Brew
 NBCD 141	Rodrigo Amado Quartet with Alexander von Schlippenbach - The Field
 NBCD 142	Szilard Mezei Tubass Quintet - Rested Turquoise
 NBCD 143	Itaru Oki Quartet - Live at Jazz Spot Combo, 1975
 NBCD 144	Mototeru Takagi Quartet - Live at Little John, Yokohama 1999
 NBCD 145	Total Music Association - Walpurgisnacht
 NBCD 146	Sam Rivers - Archive Series Vol. 5: Undulation
 NBCD 147–151	Joel Futterman - Creation Series
 NBCD 152	Keith Tippett / Howard Riley - Journal Four
 NBCD 153	Daunik Lazro Quintet - Sonoris Causa
 NBCD 154	Rob Brown / Juan Pablo Carletti - Fertile Garden
 NBCD 155	Sam Rivers - Archive Series Vol. 6: Caldera
 NBCD 156	Yuji Takahashi / Sabu Toyozumi - The Quietly Cloud and the Wild Crane
 NBCD 157	Mototeru Takagi / Kim Dae Hwan / Choi Sun Bae - Seishin - Seido
 NBCD 158	Kirk Knuffke / Michael Bisio - For You I Don't Want to Go
 NBCD 159	The Attic (Rodrigo Amadfo / Gonçalo Almeida / Onno Govaert) - Love Ghosts

LP releases

 NBLP 1	Mats Gustafsson - The Vilnius Implosion
 NBLP 2–3	Trio X (Joe McPhee / Dominic Duval / Jay Rosen) - Live in Vilnius
 NBLP 4–5	David S. Ware Quartet - Live in Vilnius
 NBLP 6	Barry Guy / Mats Gustafsson - Sinners, Rather Than Saints
 NBLP 7	Daniel Blacksberg Trio - Bit Heads
 NBLP 8	Michael Bisio / Lorenzo Sanguedolce - Live at Yippie
 NBLP 9	Charles Gayle / Dominic Duval / Arkadijus Gotesmanas - Our Souls. Live in Vilnius
 NBLP 10–11	William Hooker / Darius Jones / Adam Lane / Aaron Bennett / Weasel Walter / Damon Smith - Earth's Orbit
 NBLP 12–13	Howard Riley - Live in Vilnius
 NBLP 14–15	Jason Kao Hwang / Will Connell Jr. / William Parker / Takeshi Zen Matsuura - Commitment: Live in Germany, 1983
 NBLP 16	Amalgam - Trevor Watts / Jeff Clyne / John Stevens / Barry Guy - Prayer for Peace
 NBLP 17	Kirk Knuffke / Lisle Ellis / Kenny Wollesen - Chew My Food
 NBLP 18	Harris Eisenstadt Nonet - Woodblock Prints
 NBLP 19 	Atomic - Boom Boom
 NBLP 20–22	Atomic - Bikini Tapes
 NBLP 23	The Nu Band (Roy Campbell Jr. / Mark Whitecage / Joe Fonda / Lou Grassi) - Live in Paris
 NBLP 24	Dominic Duval / Jimmy Halperin / Brian Willson - Music of John Coltrane
 NBLP 25	Joëlle Léandre / India Cooke - Journey
 NBLP 26	Liudas Mockūnas / Eugenijus Kanevičius / Dalius Naujokaitis - Kablys. Live at 11:20
 NBLP 27	Joe Morris - Sensor
 NBLP 28	Szilard Mezei - February Fadontes
 NBLP 29	Oluyemi Thomas / Sirone / Michael Wimberly - Beneath Tones Floor
 NBLP 30–31	Thomas Chapin / William Hooker - Crossing Points
 NBLP 32–33	Thomas Heberer / Joachim Badenhorst / Pascal Niggenkemper - Klippe / One
 NBLP 34	Sei Miguel / Pedro Gomes - Turbina Anthem
 NBLP 35–36	Tarfala Trio (Mats Gustafsson / Barry Guy / Raymond Strid) - Syzygy
 NBLP 37	RED trio + John Butcher - Empire
 NBLP 38	Billy Bang's Survival Ensemble featuring William Parker - Black Man's Blues
 NBLP 39	Joe McPhee / Michael Zerang - Creole Gardens (A New Orleans Suite)
 NBLP 40	Pascal Niggenkemper / Simon Nabatov / Gerald Cleaver - Upcoming Hurricane
 NBLP 41–42	Julius Hemphill / Peter Kowald - Live at Kassiopeia
 NBLP 43	Daunik Lazro trio - Curare
 NBLP 44	Nobuyasu Furuya / Rodrigo Pinheiro / Eduardo Lala / Hernani Faustino / Gabriel Ferrandini - The Mayor
 NBLP 45	Ran Blake - Vilnius Noir
 NBLP 46	Nate Wooley / Christian Weber / Paul Lytton - Six Feet Under
 NBLP 47–48	The Thing with Barry Guy - Metal!
 NBLP 49–50	Burton Greene - Live at Kerrytown House
 NBLP 51	Bobby Bradford / Frode Gjerstad / Ingebrigt Håker Flaten / Paal Nilssen-Love - Kampen
 NBLP 52–53	Mikolaj Trzaska / Olie Brice / Mark Sanders - Riverloam Trio
 NBLP 54	Liudas Mockūnas / Barry Guy - Lava
 NBLP 55	The Group (Ahmed Abdullah / Marion Brown / Billy Bang / Fred Hopkins / Sirone / Andrew Cyrille) - Live
 NBLP 56	Szilard Mezei Tubass Quintet - Canons - 2nd Hoisting
 NBLP 57–58	Thomas Borgmann / Wilber Morris / Reggie Nicholson - Nasty & Sweet
 NBLP 59	Mats Gustafsson with Correction - Shift
 NBLP 60–61	Evan Parker / Barry Guy / Paul Lytton - Live at Maya Recordings Festival
 NBLP 62–63	Melodic Art-Tet (Ahmed Abdullah / Charles Brackeen / William Parker / Roger Blank / Tony Waters) - Melodic Art-Tet
 NBLP 64	Myra Melford / Steven Lugerner / Darren Johnston / Matt Wilson - For We Have Heard
 NBLP 65	John Tchicai / Charlie Kohlhase / Garrison Fewell / Cecil McBee / Billy Hart - Tribal Ghost
 NBLP 66	Fabric Trio (Frank Paul Schubert / Mike Majkowski / Yorgos Dimitriadis) - Murmurs
 NBLP 67	RED Trio - Rebento
 NBLP 68	Adam Lane / Darius Jones / Vijay Anderson - Absolute Horizon
 NBLP 69	YAPP (Brian Rogers / Alban Bailly / Matt Engle / David Flaherty - Symbolic Heads
 NBLP 70	Mikolaj Trzaska / Devin Hoff / Michael Zerang - Sleepless in Chicago
 NBLP 71–72	Kidd Jordan / Peter Kowald / Alvin Fielder - Live in New Orleans
 NBLP 73	Nate Wooley / Hugo Antunes / Chris Corsano - Malus
 NBLP 74	Jason Ajemian / Tony Malaby / Rob Mazurek / Chad Taylor - A Way a Land of Life
 NBLP 75	Rodrigo Amado / Peter Evans / Miguel Mira / Gabriel Ferrandini - Live in Lisbon
 NBLP 76	Daniel Blacksberg Trio - Perilous Architecture
 NBLP 77	Kent Carter / Gianni Lenoci / Bill Elgart - Plaything
 NBLP 78	Earl Cross / Idris Ackamoor / Rashied Al Akbar / Muhammad Ali - Ascent of the Nether Creatures
 NBLP 79	Juan Pablo Carletti / Tony Malaby / Christopher Hoffman - Nino / Brujo
 NBLP 80	ROIL (Chris Abrahams / Mike Majkowski / James Waples) - Raft of the Meadows
 NBLP 81–82	Ted Daniel / Daniel Carter / Oliver Lake / Richard Pierce / Tatsuya Nakamura - Innerconnection
 NBLP 83	Stefan Keune / Dominic Lash / Steve Noble - Fractions
 NBLP 84	The Convergence Quartet - Owl Jacket
 NBLP 85	Howard Riley - 10.11.12
 NBLP 86	John Lindberg / Anil Eraslan - Juggling Kukla
 NBLP 87	Bobby Bradford / Frode Gjerstad Quartet - Delaware River
 NBLP 88	Giovanni Di Domenico / Peter Jacquemyn / Chris Corsano - A Little Off the Top 
 NBLP 89	Martin Küchen / Jon Rune Strøm / Tollef Østvang - Melted Snow
 NBLP 90	Marilyn Lerner / Ken Filiano / Lou Grassi - Live at Edgefest
 NBLP 91	Thomas Borgmann / Max Johnson / Willi Kellers - One for Cisco
 NBLP 92–93	Vladimir Tarasov / Eugenijus Kanevičius / Liudas Mockūnas - Intuitus
 NBLP 94	Fail Better! - OWT
 NBLP 95	Nate Wooley / Hugo Antunes / Jorge Queijo / Mario Costa / Chris Corsano - Purple Patio
 NBLP 96	Bobby Bradford / Hafez Modirzadeh / Mark Dresser / Alex Cline - Live at the Open Gate
 NBLP 97	Arthur Williams / Peter Kuhn / Toshinori Kondo / William Parker / Denis Charles - Forgiveness Suite
 NBLP 98	John Dikeman / Luis Vicente / Hugo Antunes / Gabriel Ferrandini - Salao Brasil
 NBLP 99	The Nu Band (Roy Campbell Jr. / Mark Whitecage / Joe Fonda / Lou Grassi) - The Final Concert
 NBLP 100	Dave Burrell / Bob Stewart - The Crave
 NBLP 101	Martin Kuchen / Mark Tokar / Arkadijus Gotesmanas - Live at Vilnius Jazz Festival
 NBLP 102	Paul Rutherford / Sabu Toyozumi - The Conscience
 NBLP 103	Itaru Oki / Nobuyoshi Ino / Choi Sun Bae - Kami Fusen
 NBLP 104	Klaus Treuheit / Lou Grassi - Port of Call
 NBLP 105	Anemone (John Butcher / Peter Evans / Frederic Blondy / Clayton Thomas / Paul Lovens) - A Wing Dissolved in Light
 NBLP 106	Andrew Lamb / Warren Smith / Arkadijus Gotesmanas - The Sea of Modicum
 NBLP 107	Harris Eisenstadt / Mivos String Quartet - Whatever Will Happen That Will Also Be
 NBLP 108	Bobby Bradford / Hafez Modirzadeh / Ken Filiano / Royal Hartigan - Live at the Magic Triangle
 NBLP 109	Mark Dresser - Modicana
 NBLP 110	Liudas Mockunas - Hydro
 NBLP 111	Barre Phillips / Motoharu Yoshizawa - Oh My, Those Boys!
 NBLP 112	Samuel Blaser / Gerry Hemingway - Oostum
 NBLP 113	Kang Tae Hwan - Live at Café Amores
 NBLP 114	Martin Blume / Tobias Delius / Achim Kaufmann / Dieter Manderscheid - Frames and Terrains
 NBLP 115	Alexander von Schlippenbach / Aki Takase - Live at Café Amores
 NBLP 116	Kaoru Abe / Sabu Toyozumi - Banka
 NBLP 117	Choi Sun Bae / Junji Hirose / Motoharu Yoshizawa / Kim Dae Hwan - Arirang Fantasy
 NBLP 118	Martin Kuchen / Rafal Mazur - Baza
 NBLP 119	Bobby Bradford / Hafez Modirzadeh / Roberto Miguel Miranda / Vijay Anderson - Live at the Blue Whale
 NBLP 120	Wadada Leo Smith / Sabu Toyozumi - Burning Meditation
 NBLP 121	Lawrence Ochs / Mark Dresser / Vladimir Tarasov - Jones Jones - A Jones in Time Saves Nine
 NBLP 122	Whit Dickey / Kirk Knuffke - Drone Dream
 NBLP 123	Jan Maksimowitcz / Dmitrij Golovanov - Thousand Seconds of Our Life
 NBLP 124	Sunny Murray / Bob Dickey / Robert Andreano - Homework
 NBLP 125	Midori Takada / Kang Tae Hwan - An Eternal Moment
 NBLP 126	Albert Beger / Milton Michaeli / Shay Hazan / Ofer Bymel - The Gate
 NBLP 127	Anthony Coleman - Catenary Oath
 NBLP 128	Bones (Ziv Taubenfeld / Shay Hazan / Nir Sabag) - Reptiles
 NBLP 129	Masahiko Satoh / Sabu Toyozumi - The Aiki
 NBLP 130	Frode Gjerstad / Bobby Bradford / Kent Carter / John Stevens - Blue Cat
 NBLP 131	Evan Parker / Barry Guy / Paul Lytton - Concert in Vilnius
 NBLP 132	Agusti Fernandez / Liudas Mockunas - Improdimensions
 NBLP 133	Thomas Borgmann / Jan Roder / Willi Kellers - Keys & Screws - Some More Jazz
 NBLP 134	DUX Orchestra (Mats Gustafsson / Dave Sewelson / Will Connell / Susie Ibarra / jc morrison / David Hofstra / Walter Perkins) - Duck Walks Dog (with mixed results)
 NBLP 135	Conrad Bauer Trio - The Gift
 NBLP 136 	Vincent Chancey / Wilber Morris / Warren Smith - The Spell
 NBLP 137	Barry Guy - Irvin's Comet
 NBLP 138	Juozas Milasius / Tomas Kutavicius / Dalius Naujokaitis + Lithuanian Young Composers Orchestra - Live at Willisau, 1993
 NBLP 139 	Sabu Toyozumi / Mats Gustafsson - Hokusai
 NBLP 140	Nate Wooley / Liudas Mockūnas / Barry Guy / Arkadijus Gotesmanas - NOX
 NBLP 141	Derek Bailey / Mototeru Takagi - Live at FarOut, Atsugi, 1987
 NBLP 142	Katarsis 4 - Live at the Underground Water Reservoir
 NBLP 143	Frode Gjerstad / Kent Carter / John Stevens - Detail-90
 NBLP 144	Itaru Oki Quartet - Live at Jazz Spot Combo, 1975
 NBLP 145	Lao Dan / Deng Boyu - TUTU Duo
 NBLP 146	Mototeru Takagi Quartet - Live at Little John, Yokohama 1999
 NBLP 147	Liudas Mockunas duo - Pacemaker
 NBLP 148	Masayuki Takayanagi Trio - Live at Jazz Lovely
 NBLP 149	Gebhard Ullmann / Steve Swell / Hilliard Greene - We Are Playing In Here?
 NBLP 150	Yuji Takahashi / Sabu Toyozumi - The Quiet Clouds and the Wild Crane
 NBLP 151	Mototeru Takagi / Kim Dae Hwan / Choi Sun Bae - Seishin - Seido
 NBLP 152–156	Sam Rivers - Archive Series

EP releases

 NBEP 1	Tarfala Trio (Mats Gustafsson / Barry Guy / Raymond Strid) - Syzygy
 NBEP 2	Barry Guy - Five Fizzles for Samuel Beckett
 NBEP 3	Jean-Luc Cappozzo / Didier Lasserre - Ceremony's a Name For the Rich Horn
 NBEP 4	Shay Hazan / Albert Beger / Eyal Netzer / Nadav Masel / Haim Peskoff / Ofer Bymel - Good Morning Universe

Contemporary Classics Series

 NBCC 1	Works by Osvaldas Balakauskas performed by the Chordos String Quartet
 NBCC 2	Works by Onutė Narbutaitė performed by the Chordos String Quartet
 NBCC 3	LENsemble Vilnius - Horizons
 NBCC 4	Thomas Hummel - For Vykintas
 NBCC 5–6	Liudas Mockūnas - Polylogues
 NBCC 7	Contemporary Music From Ukraine
 NBCC 8	Vykintas Baltakas - Sandwritings
 NBCC 9	Bronius Kutavičius - Magic Squares
 NBCC 10	LENsemble - Contemporary Music Series: Orient
 NBCC 11	Karlheinz Stockhausen - Prozession

References

Jazz record labels
Record labels established in 2008
Lithuanian record labels